The Mingzhi Academy is a former academy during the Qing Dynasty rule of Taiwan in Taishan District, New Taipei, Taiwan.

History
The academy was founded in 1763 by Hu Chuo-yo who came from Yongding, Fujian in which he donated the land and raised funds. The academy building collapsed in 2003 and was subsequently restored.

Architecture
The two side walls of the building features the introduction to the history and architecture of the academy.

See also
 List of tourist attractions in Taiwan

References

1763 establishments in Taiwan
Academies in Taiwan
Buildings and structures in New Taipei
School buildings completed in 1763
Tourist attractions in New Taipei